Nevus (plural nevi) is a nonspecific medical term for a visible, circumscribed, chronic lesion of the skin or mucosa. The term originates from nævus, which is Latin for "birthmark"; however, a nevus can be either congenital (present at birth) or acquired. Common terms, including mole, birthmark, and beauty mark, are used to describe nevi, but these terms do not distinguish specific types of nevi from one another.

Classification
The term nevus is applied to a number of conditions caused by neoplasias and hyperplasias of melanocytes, as well as a number of pigmentation disorders, both hypermelanotic (containing increased melanin, the pigment responsible for skin color) and hypomelanotic (containing decreased melanin). Suspicious skin moles which are multi-colored or pink may be a finding in skin cancer.

Increased melanin

Usually acquired 
 Melanocytic nevus
 Melanocytic nevi can be categorized based on the location of melanocytic cells
 Junctional: epidermis 
 Intradermal: dermis 
 Compound: epidermis and dermis 
 Atypical (dysplastic) nevus: This type of nevus must be diagnosed based on histological features. Clinically, atypical nevi are characterized by variable pigmentation and irregular borders.
 Becker's nevus
 Blue nevus (rarely congenital): A classic blue nevus is usually smaller than 1 cm, flat, and blue-black in color.
 Hori's nevus
 Nevus spilus (speckled lentiginous nevus): This lesion includes dark speckles within a tan-brown background.
 Pigmented spindle cell nevus
 Spitz nevus
 Zosteriform lentiginous nevus

Usually congenital 
 Congenital melanocytic nevus
 These nevi are often categorized based on size, however, the lesions usually grow in proportion to the body over time, so the category may change over an individual's life. This categorization is important because large congenital melanocytic nevi are associated with an increased risk of melanoma, a serious type of skin cancer.
 Small: <1.5 cm
 Medium: 1.5–19.9 cm
 Large: ≥ 20 cm
 Nevus of Ito
 Nevus of Ota

Decreased melanin

Acquired 
 Nevus anemicus

Congenital 
 Nevus depigmentosus

Additional types of nevi do not involve disorders of pigmentation or melanocytes. These additional nevi represent hamartomatous proliferations of the epithelium, connective tissue, and vascular malformations.

Epidermal nevi
These nevi represent excess growth of specific cells types found in the skin, including those that make up oil and sweat glands.
 Verrucous epidermal nevus
 Nevus sebaceous
 Nevus comedonicus
 Eccrine nevus
 Apocrine nevus

Connective tissue nevi
Connective tissue nevi represent abnormalities of collagen in the dermis, the deep layer of the skin.
 Collagenoma
 Elastoma

Vascular nevi
These nevi represent excess growth of blood vessels, including capillaries.
 Nevus simplex (nevus flammeus nuchae), also known as a stork bite or salmon patch.

Intramucosal nevi
An intramucosal nevus is a nevus within the mucosa as found in for example the mouth and genital areas. In the mouth, they are found most frequently on the hard palate. They are typically light brown and dome-shaped. Intramucosal nevi account for 64% of all reported case of oral nevi.

Diagnosis 

Nevi are typically diagnosed clinically with the naked eye or using dermatoscopy. More advanced imaging tests are available for distinguishing melanocytic nevi from melanoma, including computerized dermoscopy and image analysis. The management of nevi depends on the type of nevus and the degree of diagnostic uncertainty. Some nevi are known to be benign, and may simply be monitored over time. Others may warrant more thorough examination and biopsy for histopathological examination (looking at a sample of skin under a microscope to detect unique cellular features). For example, a clinician may want to determine whether a pigmented nevus is a type of melanocytic nevus, dysplastic nevus, or melanoma as some of these skin lesions pose a risk for malignancy. The ABCDE criteria (asymmetry, border irregularity, color variegation, diameter > 6 mm, and evolution) are often used to distinguish nevi from melanomas in adults, while modified criteria (amelanosis, bleeding or bumps, uniform color, small diameter or de novo, and evolution) can be used when evaluating suspicious lesions in children.  In addition to histopathological examination, some lesions may also warrant additional tests to aid in diagnosis, including special stains, immunohistochemistry, and electron microscopy. Typically, the nevi that exist since childhood are harmless.

Differential diagnoses 
Hypermelanotic nevi must be differentiated from other types of pigmented skin lesions, including:
 Lentigo simplex
 Solar lentigo
 Café au lait macule
 Ink-spot lentigo
 Mucosal melanotic macule
 Mongolian spot (dermal melanocytosis)

Management 

The management of a nevus depends on the specific diagnosis, however, the options for treatment generally include the following modalities:

Observation

Destruction 
 Chemical peels
 Cryotherapy
 Dermabrasion
 Electrodessication
 Laser ablation

Surgery 
The decision to observe or treat a nevus may depend on a number of factors, including cosmetic concerns, irritative symptoms (e.g., pruritus), ulceration, infection, and concern for potential malignancy.

Syndromes 
The term nevus is included in the names of multiple dermatologic syndromes:
 Basal cell nevus syndrome
 Blue rubber bleb nevus syndrome
 Dysplastic nevus syndrome
 Epidermal nevus syndrome
 Linear nevus sebaceous syndrome

See also
Skin lesion

References

External links 

Dermatologic terminology
Disturbances of human pigmentation
Melanoma